Instinto y Deseo (Eng.: Instinct and Desire) is the seventh studio album released on January 30, 2001 by performer Víctor Manuelle. This album became his first number-one album in the Billboard Top Latin Albums. Also received a Billboard Latin Music Award nomination for Tropical/Salsa Album of the Year, Male, which was awarded to Libre by Marc Anthony.

Track listing
No Eres la Mujer (Diego Javier González) — 4:49
Me Da lo Mismo (Omar Alfanno) — 4:32
Lejos (Ramón Rodríguez) — 4:50
Cómo Se lo Explico al Corazón (Héctor Rivera) — 4:41
Quisiera Inventar (Diego Javier González) — 4:40
Te Voy an Encontrar (Omar Alfanno) — 4:48
Instinto y Deseo (Salsa version) (Héctor Gustavo) — 4:23
Ni Un Día Más (Gustavo Márquez) — 4:31
Así Fué (Juan Gabriel) — 4:44
Instinto y Deseo (Pop version) — 4:23

Credits
This information from Allmusic.
José Lugo: Piano, arranger, keyboards, producer
Víctor Manuelle: Arranger
Ernesto Sánchez: Arranger
Tommy Villarini: Trumpet, arranger
Rolando Alejandro: Engineer
Carmelo Álvarez: bongos
Vicente Cusi Castillo: Trumpet
Osvaldo De La Rosa: Copyist
Jorge Díaz: Trombone
Jan Duclerc: Trumpet
Chago Martínez: percussion, timbales
Gilberto Méndez: Bass
Luis "Perico" Ortíz: Trumpet
Roberto Pérez: Arranger
Marc Quiñones: Bongos, conga, timbales
Johnny Rivera: vocals
Angel Torres: saxophone (Baritone)
Johnny Torres: Transcription
Bobby Valentín: Bass, arranger
Antonio "Tonito" Vásquez: Trombone
Tony Vera: Photography
Frank Gener Villar: Digital art
Martha Medina: Make-Up, stylist

Chart performance

Sales and certifications

See also
List of number-one Billboard Top Latin Albums of 2001
List of number-one Billboard Tropical Albums from the 2000s

References

2001 albums
Víctor Manuelle albums
Sony Discos albums